Pia Morelius (born 31 March 1966) is a Swedish ice hockey player.

Career    
Morelius began her career with Södertälje, before transferring to FoC Farsta. She played in the inaugural IIHF Women's World Championship in 1990, and would appear again at the World Champhionships in 1992, 1994, and 1997. She also competed in the women's tournament at the 1998 Winter Olympics.

She would retire from international hockey after the Olympics.

References

External links
 Biographical information and career statistics from Elite Prospects

1966 births
Living people
Swedish women's ice hockey players
Olympic ice hockey players of Sweden
Ice hockey players at the 1998 Winter Olympics
Ice hockey people from Stockholm